Aundria Michelle Bowman (born Alexis Miranda Badger; June 23, 1974disappeared March 11, 1989) was an American teenager who vanished under mysterious circumstances from her family's property in Hamilton, Michigan. Adopted as an infant, Aundria Bowman was raised by her adoptive father, Dennis Bowman. At age 14, she accused him of molesting her. A short time after this incident, she vanished from her family's rural property. Dennis Bowman claimed that she had stolen money from her adopters before running away.  

She remained a missing person for more than 30 years, and her case was classified as a runaway. In November 2019, Dennis Bowman was arrested for the September 1980 murder of Kathleen Doyle in Norfolk, Virginia. Dennis Bowman was extradited to Virginia in February 2020 to face charges in Doyle's murder, and in May 2020, was charged with Aundria Bowman's murder.

Aundria Bowman's case has received national media attention, including coverage by Inside Edition and Oxygen. In 1993, she was one of several missing children whose photographs were shown in the music video for the Soul Asylum song "Runaway Train".

Background
Aundria Bowman was born Alexis Miranda Badger on June 23, 1974 in New Orleans, Louisiana. At nine months old, she was placed for adoption by her biological mother, Cathy Terkanian, and, after a period in foster care, was adopted by the Bowman family of Michigan at 21 months old, and renamed Aundria.

Disappearance
In late 1988, Bowman raised concerns with staff at her high school when she expressed fearfulness of going home from school. Staff at the school involved police, who interviewed Bowman, during which she claimed that her adoptive father was molesting her. A social worker returned Bowman to her family's residence, and confronted them about Bowman's allegations; Dennis and his then-wife both refused the allegations, claiming that Bowman's rebelliousness had been sparked by her family's recent disclosure that she had been adopted as an infant. 

Shortly after this incident, the Bowmans relocated to a mobile home in a rural area of Allegan County. This was the last place Aundria Bowman was seen. When her family reported her missing, Dennis Bowman claimed she had stolen money from him before running away. Bowman's case was classified as an "endangered runaway."

Investigation
Following the reporting of Aundria Bowman as missing, her family relocated from the property where they had resided. In the intervening months, Bowman's adoptive mother made several calls to police in which she stated she had been told of numerous sightings of Aundria Bowman, though these could not be substantiated. Dennis Bowman's criminal record at the time of her disappearance was notable: in 1980, he was arrested after a young woman claimed he attempted to lure and assault her in a wooded area in western Michigan. He pleaded guilty to the assault after working out a deal with prosecutors. 

In 1993, Bowman's photograph was shown in the music video for the Soul Asylum song "Runaway Train" (1993), among other missing children.

In 1998, Dennis Bowman was arrested for breaking and entering the home of a coworker in Ottawa County to steal items, including the woman's lingerie. Before his sentencing in the case, Dennis Bowman referenced his missing daughter in a letter to the presiding judge: "I am the father of two lovely daughters, one 25 and the other 11, and feel that being a parent is one of the most important and sobering things a person can undertake."

A Jane Doe discovered in a Wisconsin corn field in 1999, later determined to be Peggy Johnson, was suspected to potentially be Aundria Bowman due to a notable resemblance. However, Bowman was ruled out as a possibility through DNA profiling provided by her biological mother, Cathy.

Later developments

Arrest of Dennis Bowman
Aundria's adoptive father, Dennis Bowman, was arrested in November 2019 for the unsolved homicide of 25-year-old Kathleen Doyle in Norfolk, Virginia, which occurred on September 11, 1980. During this time, Bowman had been in the midst of the court proceedings for his attempted assault of a young woman, though he was unable to attend court hearings for a two-week period in September 1980, claiming he was a member of the United States Navy Reserves and was required to attend a two-week drill.

Confession and recovery of remains
In early February 2020, it was reported that Dennis Bowman, incarcerated while pending trial for the murder of Kathleen Doyle, confessed to police that he had murdered his adopted daughter, Aundria. Several days later, it was announced that skeletal remains had been recovered from the 3200 block of 136th Avenue of Monterey Township (near the home of Bowman) in Allegan County, concealed by a thin layer of cement. On February 9, 2020, Dennis Bowman was extradited to Virginia to face charges in Mrs Doyle's murder.

It was subsequently confirmed via DNA that the remains were in fact Aundria Bowman. On May 15, 2020, Dennis Bowman was charged with the murder of Aundria. He pleaded guilty to both charges in June. He was sentenced to two life sentences for killing Doyle. On December 22, 2021, Bowman pleaded no contest to second-degree murder in the death of 14-year-old Aundria in Allegan County Circuit Court. He was sentenced to an additional 35-50 years in prison for Aundria Bowman's murder.

See also
 List of homicides in Michigan
List of solved missing person cases
Murder of Linda Pagano

References

1980s missing person cases
1989 murders in the United States
Deaths by person in Michigan
Female murder victims
Formerly missing people
Incidents of violence against girls
March 1989 events in the United States
Missing person cases in Michigan
Murdered American children
People murdered in Michigan
Violence against women in the United States
History of women in Michigan